Fajr International Music Festival is Iran's most prestigious Music Festival founded in 1986. The festival is affiliated with UNESCO and includes national and international competition sections. 

Since its establishment, many musicians from several countries like Austria, Germany, France participated in the event. The festival have enjoyed a strong presence of Asian countries as well.

The 22nd Fajr International Music Festival was held in January 2007. The annual event was attended by 1,200 domestic and foreign artists performing different pieces in various categories International and Folk Music, Classical Music and Youth and Women Music. A total of 126 performances were made during the 10-day festival.

27th Festival

Winners of Music Composition Section
Leyli Mohammad Nosrati for Suite Symphony
Hamid Moradian for Mooye Kamancheh

Winners of Choir Competitive Section
Damour Vocal Band Led by Faraz Khosravi Danesh 
Avaye Mahan Group Led by Nima Fatehi
Samat Group Led by Azadeh Azimi

24th Festival: Dec, 2008, Tehran Iran

Winners of Music Composition Section 
Nima Hamidi for String Quartet No.1 "Obur"
Amir-Sadeq Kanjani for "Iranian,"
Afarin Mansouri for "Fallen Soldier"
Saman Samadi for "Night Broker,"
Sara Lesan for "Motion Continues,"
Amir-Bahador Sadafian for "Mr. Winter Died."

21st Festival

Plaques of honor
Mahmud Farahmand
Yusef Purya
Khosro Rahimian, and violist 
Fereidun Zarrinbal 
Yusef Ashrafi
Maziar Heidari
Shahram Tavakkoli

Golden Chang
Herbert Karimi-Masihi 
Morris Erisco

16th Festival

Golden Chang
Loris Tjeknavorian

13st Festival

Winners of Music Composition Section 
Shahram Mazloumi
Mehdi Bozorgmehr
Amir Moeeni and Mitra Basiri

10th Festival

Plaques of honor

Parichehr Khajeh
Sara Tavasoli
Nakisa Karimian
Farangis Moussavi
Mahsa Ghassemi

9th Festival

Golden Chang
Sina Sarlak

8th Festival

Golden Chang
Bahram Osqueezadeh
 Bardia Sadeghi
 Reza Sadeghi (Santoor)

See also
National Festival of Youth Music
Fajr International Film Festival

References

External links
 Fajr International Music and Arts Festival official website
 Iranian Concert Tickets Website

Music festivals in Iran